A table is an arrangement of information or data, typically in rows and columns, or possibly in a more complex structure. Tables are widely used in communication, research, and data analysis. Tables appear in print media, handwritten notes, computer software, architectural ornamentation, traffic signs, and many other places. The precise conventions and terminology for describing tables vary depending on the context. Further, tables differ significantly in variety, structure, flexibility, notation, representation and use. Information or data conveyed in table form is said to be in tabular format (adjective). In books and technical articles, tables are typically presented apart from the main text in numbered and captioned floating blocks.

Basic description 
A table consists of an ordered arrangement of rows and columns. This is a simplified description of the most basic kind of table. Certain considerations follow from this simplified description:

 the term row has several common synonyms (e.g., record, k-tuple, n-tuple, vector);
 the term column has several common synonyms (e.g., field, parameter, property, attribute, stanchion);
 a column is usually identified by a name;
 a column name can consist of a word, phrase or a numerical index;
 the intersection of a row and a column is called a cell.

The elements of a table may be grouped, segmented, or arranged in many different ways, and even nested recursively. Additionally, a table may include metadata, annotations, a header, a footer or other ancillary features.

Simple table 
The following illustrates a simple table with three columns and nine rows. The first row is not counted, because it is only used to display the column names. This is called a "header row".

Multi-dimensional table 

The concept of dimension is also a part of basic terminology. Any "simple" table can be represented as a "multi-dimensional"
table by normalizing the data values into ordered hierarchies. A common example of such a table is a multiplication table.

In multi-dimensional tables, each cell in the body of the table (and the value of that cell) relates to the values at the beginnings of the column (i.e. the header), the row, and other structures in more complex tables. This is an injective relation: each combination of the values of the headers row (row 0, for lack of a better term) and the headers column (column 0 for lack of a better term) is related to a unique cell in
the table:

 Column 1 and row 1 will only correspond to cell (1,1);
 Column 1 and row 2 will only correspond to cell (2,1) etc.

The first column often presents information dimension description by which the rest of the table is navigated. This column is called "stub column". Tables may contain three or multiple dimensions and can be classified by the number of dimensions. Multi-dimensional tables may have super-rows - rows that describe additional dimensions for the rows that are presented below that row and are usually grouped in a tree-like structure.  This structure is typically visually presented with an appropriate number of white spaces in front of each stub's label.

In literature tables often present numerical values, cumulative statistics, categorical values, and at times parallel descriptions in form of text. They can condense large amount of information to a limited space and therefore they are popular in scientific literature in many fields of study.

Generic representation
As a communication tool, a table allows a form of generalization of information from an unlimited number of different social or scientific contexts. It provides a familiar way to convey information that might otherwise not be obvious or readily understood.

For example, in the following diagram, two alternate representations of the same information are presented side by side. On the left is the NFPA 704 standard "fire diamond" with example values indicated and on the right is a simple table displaying the same values, along with additional information. Both representations convey essentially the same information, but the tabular representation is arguably more comprehensible to someone who is not familiar with the NFPA 704 standard. The tabular representation may not, however, be ideal for every circumstance (for example because of space limitations, or safety reasons).

Specific uses
There are several specific situations in which tables are routinely used as a matter of custom or formal convention.

Publishing
 Cross-reference (Table of contents)

Mathematics

 Arithmetic (Multiplication table)
 Logic (Truth table)

Natural sciences
 Chemistry (Periodic table)
 Oceanography (tide table)

Information technology

Software applications
Modern software applications give users the ability to generate, format, and edit tables and tabular data for a wide variety of uses, for example:
word processing applications;
spreadsheet applications;
presentation software;
tables specified in HTML or another markup language

Software development 
Tables have uses in software development for both high-level specification and low-level implementation.
Usage in software specification can encompass ad hoc inclusion of simple decision tables in textual documents through to the use of tabular specification methodologies, examples of which include Software Cost Reduction and Statestep.
Proponents of tabular techniques, among whom David Parnas is prominent, emphasize their understandability, as well as the quality and cost advantages of a format allowing systematic inspection, while corresponding shortcomings experienced with a graphical notation were cited in motivating the development of at least two tabular approaches.

At a programming level, software may be implemented using constructs generally represented or understood as tabular, whether to store data (perhaps to memoize earlier results), for example, in arrays or hash tables, or control tables determining the flow of program execution in response to various events or inputs.

Databases 
Database systems often store data in structures called tables; in which columns are data fields and rows represent data records.

Historical relationship to furniture
In medieval counting houses, the tables were covered with a piece of checkered cloth, to count money. Exchequer is an archaic term for the English institution which accounted for money owed to the monarch. Thus the checkerboard tables of stacks of coins are a concrete realization of this information.

See also

 Chart
 Diagram
 Abstract data type
 Column (database)
 Information graphics
 Periodic table
 Reference table
 Row (database)
 Table (database)
 Table (HTML)
 Tensor
 Dependent and independent variables

References

External links 
 

Infographics
Data modeling